Chathuranga Vallabhanathar Temple (சதுரங்க வல்லபநாதர் கோயில்) is a Hindu temple located between Needamangalam and Mannargudi in the Tiruvarur district of Tamil Nadu, India. The presiding deity is Shiva.

Legend 

According to Hindu legend, a childless king named Vasudevan worshipped Shiva and as a result Parvathi was born to him as Rajarajeswari. It is also believed that Shiva appeared to the king in the guise of siddha at this place and worsted him in a game of chess. As a consequence, he married Rajarajeswari.

Significance 
It is one of the shrines of the 275 Paadal Petra Sthalams. The temple is frequented by asthma patients. Sambandar had sung praises of the temple in his Thevaram.

References

External links

Gallery

Shiva temples in Tiruvarur district
Padal Petra Stalam